Glenmore railway station may also refer to:

 Glenmore railway station (Indonesia), a railway station in Glenmore, Banyuwangi Regency, Indonesia.
 Glenmore  railway station (Ireland), a railway station in Glenmore, County Donegal, Ireland.